Todas as Mulheres do Mundo is an album by Brazilian singer Rita Lee, released in 1993 through Som Livre.

Track listing

References

Rita Lee albums
1993 albums